Harry John White (born 18 December 1994) is an English footballer who currently plays for  side Stratford Town, where he plays as a forward.

Club career 
Harry White played youth football for Coventry City Academy, and later played in non-league for Coventry Sphinx and Banbury United. In 2013 he moved to America to study and play college soccer at Lincoln Land Community College.

Gloucester City 
After a year in America, White returned to England and in his first game back at Banbury United White scored a hat-trick against Daventry, resulting in a trial at Bristol Rovers. White then signed for National League North club Gloucester City following an impressive performance while scoring against "The Tigers" for Bristol Rovers in the Gloucestershire County Cup in October 2014. He went on to play 27 games in the league, scoring a total of 7 goals.

Barnsley 
He was signed by League One side Barnsley on a 2-year deal for an undisclosed fee in September 2015. He made his debut for the "Tykes" on 6 October, coming on for Kadeem Harris 65 minutes into a 2–1 victory over Bradford City in the Football League Trophy. After a very successful goalscoring spell in Barnsley's U21s White made two first team appearances and 13 on the Barnsley bench, before he was loaned out to Kidderminster Harriers.

Kidderminster Harriers (Loan) 
White was signed on a 1-month loan deal, playing 7 games in the National League for the 'Harriers' where he scored 3 goals.

Boreham Wood (Loan) 
White then signed for fellow National League side Boreham Wood on loan for the remainder of the 2015–2016 season, scoring 2 valuable goals which helped save Boreham Wood from relegation.

Solihull Moors F.C. 
On 14 June, White was transferred from Barnsley FC to National League side Solihull Moors F.C. for an undisclosed fee. White finished the season as Moors top scorer with 12 goals from 19 starts.

Chester F.C. 
On 2 May Chester F.C. negotiated his release from a two-year contract. White finished the season with 5 goals from 20 starts. Chester F.C. ended the season in 23rd position and were subsequently relegated to the National League North.

Hereford F.C. 
On 18 June 2018, White signed for newly promoted National League North team Hereford.
He was released by mutual consent on 12 December 2018.

Redditch United 
On 13 December 2018, White signed for Southern Premier Division side Redditch United. Before joining, White signed a pre-contract to join an Australian side in January.

Oakleigh Cannons
The Australian club turned out to be Oakleigh Cannons, which he joined on 15 January 2019.

Stratford Town
White returned to English football on 24 September 2020, when he was confirmed as signing for Southern League Premier Division Central side Stratford Town.

Statistics 

Notes
Early career statistics not known.

References

External links 
 

1994 births
Living people
English footballers
Association football forwards
Earlswood Town F.C. players
Coventry Sphinx F.C. players
Banbury United F.C. players
Gloucester City A.F.C. players
Barnsley F.C. players
Kidderminster Harriers F.C. players
Boreham Wood F.C. players
Solihull Moors F.C. players
Southern Football League players
National League (English football) players
English Football League players
Chester F.C. players
Hereford F.C. players
Redditch United F.C. players
Oakleigh Cannons FC players
Stratford Town F.C. players